The creole languages include Dutch-based creole languages, English-based creole languages and French-based creole languages. Major Bible translations into creole languages include:

Gullah
The effort to translate the Bible into Gullah, a creole language spoken by residents of the Sea Islands off the eastern coast of the southern United States, began in 1979 with a team of Gullah speakers from the Penn Center. They were assisted by Pat and Claude Sharpe, translation consultants for Wycliffe Bible Translators. Pat Sharpe died in 2002, and was replaced by David and Lynn Frank. The gospels of Luke and John were released in 1995 and 2003, while the New Testament was released in 2005.

Haitian Creole
One Haitian Creole Bible "Bib La", sponsored by the Société Biblique Haïtienne (Haitian Bible Society; part of the United Bible Societies), was published in 1985 by the American Bible Society in hardcover, and a leather bound edition was published in 1999. Bibles International published another translation of the New Testament in 2002, with a second edition in 2007.

Jamaican Creole
Di Jamiekan Nyuu Testiment, published in 2012 by the Bible Society of the West Indies, is the first translation of the New Testament into Jamaican Patois.

References

External links
 Haitian Creole Version

creole
Pidgins and creoles